The 2002 Senior PGA Tour was the 23rd season since the Senior PGA Tour officially began in 1980. This was the last season for the tour under its original name; it would be renamed as the Champions Tour for its next season in 2003, and since 2016 has been known as PGA Tour Champions. The season consisted of 35 official money events with purses totalling $58,205,000, including four majors. Bob Gilder and Hale Irwin won the most tournaments, four. The tournament results, leaders, and award winners are listed below.

Tournament results
The following table shows all the official money events for the 2002 season. "Date" is the ending date of the tournament. The numbers in parentheses after the winners' names are the number of wins they had on the tour up to and including that event. Senior majors are shown in bold.

Source:

Leaders
Scoring Average leaders

Source:

Money List leaders

Source:

Career Money List leaders

Source:

Awards

See also
Champions Tour awards
Champions Tour records

References

External links
PGA Tour Champions official site

PGA Tour Champions seasons
Senior PGA Tour